Sinjeong-dong is a dong, neighbourhood of Yangcheon-gu in Seoul, South Korea.

Name
The dong was named shinjung after two of the oldest towns in the region called "sintri" and "eunhaengjeong"

History
The region was originally part of the yangcheon prefecture during the Goreyeo dynasty

See also 
Administrative divisions of South Korea

References

External links
Yangcheon-gu official website
 Sinjeong 1-dong Resident office center

Neighbourhoods of Yangcheon District